Heidi Ferrer (May 28, 1970 – May 26, 2021) was an American screenwriter who worked on Dawson's Creek, The Hottie and the Nottie, and Princess. She died by suicide after an ongoing battle with COVID-19. Following her death her organs were determined to be suitable for organ donation, despite her family's concern about the use of her organs.

Selected publications

References

External links
 

1970 births
2021 deaths
2021 suicides
20th-century American screenwriters
Suicides in California
American women screenwriters
21st-century American women